Laheys Tramway or Canungra Pine Creek Tramway was a private timber railway in South East Queensland, Australia. It connected at Canungra on the Canungra line and consisted of a  'main line' to Upper Coomera and two branches. Its tunnel was added to the Queensland Heritage Register on 11 April 2005.

Background 
Canungra was the centre of regional timber production from the 1860s and the Lahey family built a large sawmill there, completed in 1885. Situated in the middle of a hoop pine forest, logs were initially hauled short distances to the mill by bullock teams, but as the haulage distance increased a more efficient method was required.

History 
Rail engineer George Phillips surveyed and designed the route of the tramway. The tramway opened in 1900, and initially used bullocks.

Rolling stock 
The first steam locomotive, a Climax locomotive arrived in 1903, and lowered the cost of haulage by 85%.

Another locomotive, a Shay locomotive was purchased from the North Mt Lyell Mining Co. in Tasmania in 1906, and a second Shay was purchased new in 1910. The Climax loco was taken out of service in 1912, but was reconditioned by Walkers of Maryborough in 1914, being permanently withdrawn in 1922. Laheys ordered a third Shay loco in 1911, but it was on-sold to the Hampton Cloncurry Mines Ltd. Co. in 1912 without being used on the tramway.

The line also used a Ford Model T converted to a railmotor and a Commer truck converted to a shunter for use at the mill.

Operations 
The line used two types of log bogies, the 'light' model with a capacity of 10 tons and 'heavy' with a capacity of 15 tons. A bogie was placed under each end of a log to create a 'wagon' for transport to the mill. When roller bearing bogies were introduced in 1914, the average load able to be hauled was 6 wagons, a load of up to 90 tons. Whilst there was no formal passenger service, people were able to ride on the log wagons 'at their own risk', and picnic excursions were organised occasionally, planks being used to create temporary 'seating' on the log bogies.

Line extension 

Connections 
The mill employed 112 people in 1913, and bullock teams were still used to haul logs from areas not served by the tramway, as well as sawn timber from the mill to the nearest railway station, and in 1911 there were 18 bullock teams moving sawn timber between Canungra and the railway at Logan Village.

A railway from Logan Village to Canungra was first proposed in 1900 with a survey commissioned in 1908. Construction began in 1913 and the line opened on 2 July 1915.

Decline and closure 
In 1920 Laheys sold the mill and tramway to the War Service Homes Commission, but it sold the enterprise a few months later to a company associated with one of sons of the Lahey family. By 1930 most of the millable timber had been harvested, and it is estimated the mill had produced a total of 130M superfeet (~307,000 cubic metres) of timber when it closed in 1933. The tramway was dismantled that year, and the Shay locos were offered for sale, without success, as they were recorded as abandoned at Canungra in 1937.

The tunnel remains, and is a local tourist attraction. People were initially able to walk through it and perhaps see the bats that now use it as a roust, but recent safety concerns have led to the tunnel's closure, although it is still possible to walk to its entrances.

See also

Rail transport in Queensland
 List of tramways in Queensland

References

External links
 1925 map of the Queensland railway system

Railway lines opened in 1900
Railway lines closed in 1933
3 ft 6 in gauge railways in Australia
Closed railway lines in Queensland
1900 establishments in Australia
1933 disestablishments in Australia
Scenic Rim Region
Logging railways in Australia